USAN or Usan may refer to:

Organizations
 Union of South American Nations
 United States Adopted Name
 United States Navy

Places
 Usan-guk, a Korean state that existed in the first millennium AD